Misgav Dov (lit. Dov's Fortress) is a moshav in south-central Israel. Located near Gedera in the coastal plain, it falls under the jurisdiction of Gederot Regional Council.

History
The moshav was founded though the Mishkei Herut Beitar settlement movement by Herut members from Haifa in 1950 on land that had belonged to the depopulated Palestinian village of Bashshit. 

It was named after Dov Gruner, a member of the Irgun who was executed by the British authorities. The founders were later joined by new immigrants from Iraq, Poland and the Soviet Union.

References

Moshavim
Populated places in Central District (Israel)
Populated places established in 1950
1950 establishments in Israel